Aleksenko is a Russified form of the Ukrainian surname Oleksenko, derived from a diminutive  for the first name Oleksiy (Олексій).

The surname may refer to:
 Vladimir Aleksenko, Soviet aviator, twice Hero of the Soviet Union
 Ivan Aleksenko (:ru:Алексенко, Иван Никанорович), Soviet tank designer, author of T-24 tank
 Val Aleksenko, co-creator of LivingSocial website
 Fyodor Aleksenko, Russian Premier League footballer

Similar surnames: Oleksienko, Alekseyenko/Alekseenko

Ukrainian-language surnames
Russian-language surnames
Patronymic surnames
Surnames from given names